Hamada Madi, widely known as "Boléro", is a Comorian politician, former Prime Minister and interim President. He is Secretary General of the Indian Ocean Commission.

Biography 
Born on the island of Mohéli in 1965, he gained a degree in constitutional law in Ukraine and worked as a political adviser in Comoros, becoming secretary general of the Comoros Republican Party.

In January 2002, it was agreed, despite some opposition, that he would replace Colonel Azali Assoumani as interim head of state and oversee the Transitional Government of National Unity in the run-up to the legislative and presidential elections. Due to his Mohélian origins, he was ineligible to run for the union presidency in 2002, when the first four-year term was reserved for a Grande Comorian. After the return of Azali to the presidency in May 2002, Hamada Madi was kept on as special advisor without portfolio with Union cabinet status.

After waiting several months Bolero got the permission from the Presidency in April 2007 to leave the country.

In 2016 Modi became Secretary General of the Indian Ocean Commission.

References

1965 births
Living people
Presidents of the Comoros
People from Mohéli
Prime Ministers of the Comoros
Comorian expatriates in France